was a Japanese physicist. Matsubara proposed a method of statistical mechanics related to  Green's function (many-body theory), by applying quantum field theory techniques to statistical physics. This method, commonly known as Matsubara Green's function technique, introduces the notion of imaginary time, and the reciprocal variable to this imaginary time is known as discrete Matsubara frequency.

Matsubara graduated from Osaka Imperial University, and worked as full professor in Hokkaido University, Kyoto University, and Okayama University of Science. He was the winner of the Nishina Memorial Prize in 1961, and took the directorship of the Physical Society of Japan.

His work with Yukata Toyozawa on impurity bands in semiconductors has led to the Matsubara-Toyozawa model that describes the motion of an electron in a random lattice.

His research interests were dielectric materials, superconductivity and superfluidity. He wrote various physics textbooks in Japanese.

References

External links 
 Kotobank.jp 

1921 births
2014 deaths
Japanese physicists
People from Osaka
Academic staff of Hokkaido University
Academic staff of Kyoto University
Osaka University alumni
Presidents of the Physical Society of Japan